Bećir Omeragić (born 20 January 2002) is a Swiss professional footballer who plays as a defender for Swiss Super League club Zürich and the Switzerland national team.

Club career
Omeragić made his Swiss Super League debut for Zürich on 4 May 2019 in a game against Basel, as an 80th-minute substitute for Alain Nef.

International career
Omeragić is a youth international for Switzerland.
In September 2020, he had called up to the Switzerland squad for UEFA Nations League fixtures against Ukraine and Germany. He made his debut on 7 October 2020 in a friendly against Croatia.

In 2021 he was called up to the national team for the 2020 UEFA European Championship, where the team created one of the main sensations of the tournament reaching the quarter-finals.

Personal life
Born in Switzerland to Bosnian parents, his father hails from Derventa and his mother hails from Kozarac. His football idols are Sergio Ramos, Thiago Silva and Emir Spahić. He is the brother of footballer Nedim Omeragić and cousin of Edin Omeragic.

Career statistics

Club

References

External links
 

2002 births
Living people
Swiss people of Bosnia and Herzegovina descent
Footballers from Geneva
Swiss men's footballers
Association football defenders
Switzerland international footballers
Switzerland youth international footballers
UEFA Euro 2020 players
FC Zürich players
Swiss Super League players